Donald Cecil Coggins Jr. (born July 17, 1959) is a United States district judge of the United States District Court for the District of South Carolina.

Biography 

Coggins was born in Spartanburg, South Carolina, on July 17, 1959. He received a Bachelor of Arts degree in 1981 from Clemson University. He received a Juris Doctor in 1984 from the University of South Carolina School of Law. He began his legal career as an associate at the law firm of Cummings and Smith, where he was employed from 1984 to 1986. He became a named partner at the successor firms of Cummings, Smith and Coggins from 1986 to 1993 and Smith and Coggins from 1993 to 2000. From 2000 to 2017, he was a shareholder at the law firm of Harrison, White, Smith & Coggins, P.C. (formerly Harrison, White, Smith, Hayes & Coggins, P.C.), where his practice focused on civil litigation. From 2010 to 2013, he was the firm's managing shareholder. Coggins also served as a member of the South Carolina Commission on Lawyer Conduct, a position he held from 2003 to 2017.

Federal judicial service

Expired nomination to district court under Obama 

On February 25, 2016, President Obama nominated Coggins to serve as a United States District Judge of the United States District Court for the District of South Carolina, to the seat vacated by Judge Joseph F. Anderson, who assumed senior status on November 16, 2014. On June 21, 2016, a hearing before the Senate Judiciary Committee was held on his nomination. On July 14, 2016, his nomination was reported out of committee by a voice vote. His nomination expired on January 3, 2017, with the end of the 114th Congress.

Renomination to district court under Trump 

On August 3, 2017, President Donald Trump renominated Coggins to the same seat. His nomination was reported out of committee by a voice vote on September 14, 2017. On November 16, 2017, the Senate invoked cloture on his nomination by a 96–1 vote. His nomination was confirmed later that day a 96–0 vote. He received his judicial commission on November 20, 2017.

See also 
 Barack Obama judicial appointment controversies

References

External links 
 
 

1959 births
Living people
20th-century American lawyers
21st-century American lawyers
21st-century American judges
21st-century Methodists
Methodists from South Carolina
Clemson University alumni
Judges of the United States District Court for the District of South Carolina
People from Spartanburg, South Carolina
South Carolina lawyers
United States district court judges appointed by Donald Trump
University of South Carolina School of Law alumni